Panama is a source, transit, and destination country for Women and children subjected to trafficking in persons, specifically forced prostitution. Although some Panamanian women and girls are found in forced prostitution in other countries in Latin America and in Europe, most Panamanian trafficking victims are exploited within the country. Although statistics were lacking, both NGOs and government officials anecdotally reported that commercial sexual exploitation of children was greater in rural areas and in the city of Colon than in Panama City. NGOs report that some Panamanian children, mostly young girls, are subjected to involuntary domestic servitude. Weak controls along Panama's borders make the nation an easy transit point for irregular migrants, from Latin America, East Africa, and Asia, some of whom may fall victim to human trafficking.

The government of Panama does not fully comply with the minimum standards for the elimination of trafficking; however, it is making significant efforts to do so. During the reporting period, authorities increased public awareness about the prostitution of children through seminars in schools and an outreach campaign with the tourism sector. Despite such efforts, the government showed little evidence of progress in combating human trafficking. Law enforcement efforts remained weak, the Panamanian penal code did not prohibit trafficking for forced labor, and the government failed to provide adequate assistance to victims and to identify trafficking victims among vulnerable populations. U.S. State Department's Office to Monitor and Combat Trafficking in Persons placed the country in "Tier 2" in 2017.

Prosecution
The Government of Panama maintained its law enforcement efforts against trafficking crimes during the reporting period. Article 178 of the Panamanian penal code, which was updated in 2008, prohibits the internal and transnational movement of persons for the purpose of sexual servitude or forced commercial sexual activity. The prescribed sentence is four to six years imprisonment, which is increased to six to nine years if trafficking offenders use deceit, coercion, or retain identity documents, and is further increased to 10 to 15 years if the victim is under 14 years of age. Article 177 prohibits sexually exploiting another person for profit. Under aggravated circumstances of threat, force, or fraud, this constitutes human trafficking as defined by international protocol, and carries a sentence of eight to 10 years. Article 180 prohibits the internal and transnational trafficking of minors for sexual servitude, prescribing prison terms of eight to 10 years' imprisonment, and Article 179 prohibits subjecting an individual to sexual servitude using threats or violence. Prosecutors may also use other statutes, such as anti-pimping laws, to prosecute trafficking crimes. The above punishments are sufficiently stringent and commensurate with those prescribed for rape. Panamanian law, however, does not specifically prohibit human trafficking for the purpose of forced labor, including domestic servitude. During the reporting period, the government investigated eight human trafficking cases and seven cases of commercial sexual exploitation of a child, which is comparable with last year's efforts. During the year, however, authorities achieved only one conviction, compared with two achieved during the previous reporting period. The trafficking offender was sentenced to 72 months for pimping a child, which was reduced to 48 months' incarceration for unreported reasons. This sentence does not appear to meet the standards established in the Panamanian penal code for this crime.

Authorities maintained a small law enforcement unit to investigate sex trafficking and related offenses, and Panamanian law required that one prosecutor in each of Panama's 13 provinces be trained to prosecute trafficking crimes. One prosecutor based in Panama City was dedicated exclusively to prosecuting trafficking crimes. There were no reports of partnerships with foreign governments in joint investigations of trafficking crimes during the reporting period, although Panamanian authorities met with Colombian officials to exchange information. The government opened no formal trafficking-related corruption investigations during the reporting period. Some judges received training on sex trafficking. There were no reports of training for the members of the diplomatic corps abroad.

Protection
The Panamanian government sustained limited efforts to assist trafficking victims during the reporting period, though overall victim services remained inadequate, particularly for adult victims. Authorities did not employ systematic procedures for identifying trafficking victims among vulnerable populations, such as women in prostitution or detained irregular migrants. Panamanian law requires the National Immigration Office's trafficking victims unit to provide assistance to foreign trafficking victims. During the reporting period, however, authorities did not report extending victim services to repatriated Panamanian victims or foreign victims of trafficking, and the Immigration Office indicated that there were no foreign victims of trafficking over the past year. 

The government continued to provide partial funding to an NGO-operated shelter with dedicated housing and social services for child trafficking victims. This shelter, in addition to another NGO shelter working with at-risk youth, and the government's network of shelters for victims of abuse and violence could provide services to child victims of trafficking, although the government did not report assisting any child victims last year. There was no shelter care available exclusively for adult victims of trafficking. The government could house adult victims in hotels on an ad hoc basis but did not report doing so or providing any legal, medical, or psychological services or long-term care to adult trafficking victims during this reporting period. In past years, Panamanian authorities encouraged victims to assist with the investigation and prosecution of trafficking offenders, although few victims chose to do so. The government did not provide foreign victims with legal alternatives to their return to countries where they may face hardship or retribution, although in past years foreign victims were allowed to remain in country during investigations.

Prevention
The government maintained efforts to prevent human trafficking during the reporting period. To raise awareness about commercial sexual exploitation of children, the government conducted seminars in 84 schools, reaching 6,900 students, 230 teachers, and 140 parents. In collaboration with the ILO, the National Commission for the Prevention of Crimes of Sexual Exploitation, a multiagency task force, sent 300 letters to the tourism sector to raise awareness of commercial sexual exploitation of children. Child sex tourism is prohibited by law, though there were no reported prosecutions of sex tourists during the reporting period. The government implemented its National Plan for Prevention and Elimination of Commercial Sexual Exploitation of Children and Adolescents by publishing a comprehensive guide on health care of children and adolescent victims of commercial sexual exploitation and through supporting a study of sex trafficking in Panama. The government undertook no initiatives to reduce demand for forced labor.

References

Panama
Panama
Human rights abuses in Panama
Crime in Panama by type